Mahaveer Singh Rana  is an Indian politician and was a member of the 16th Legislative Assembly of Uttar Pradesh of India. Rana represented the Behat constituency of Uttar Pradesh and is a member of the BSP political party.

Early life and education
Mahaveer Singh Rana was born in Muradnagar in the state of Uttar Pradesh. He attained LL.B.degree. Rana is an Agriculturist by profession.

Political career
Rana was a one time MLA. He lost his seat in the 2017 Uttar Pradesh Assembly election to Naresh Saini of the Indian National Congress.

Posts Held

See also
Bhartiya Janta Party
Politics of India
Uttar Pradesh Legislative Assembly

References

1963 births
Living people
People from Uttar Pradesh
Bahujan Samaj Party politicians from Uttar Pradesh
Uttar Pradesh MLAs 2012–2017
Bharatiya Janata Party politicians from Uttar Pradesh